"Clare" is a song by British band Fairground Attraction, which was released on 16 January 1989 as the final single from their debut album The First of a Million Kisses. The song peaked in the UK Singles Chart at number 49. It was the last single released by the band before they split up.

Music video
A music video for the song exists filmed in New Orleans.

Critical reception
On its release as a single, Steve Lamacq of New Musical Express considered "Clare" to be a "jazzier number" than "Perfect" and felt the song was released as a single "with good reason". He added, "It busks away and Eddi Reader's athletic vocals do an exotic dance with an eligible clarinet".

Track listing

Original release
"Clare"
"The Game of Love"

Charts

References

1989 singles
Fairground Attraction songs
Songs written by Mark Nevin
1988 songs
RCA Records singles